St Michael's Grammar School is an Australian independent Anglican co-educational primary and secondary day school located in the Melbourne suburb of , Victoria. 

St Michael's was founded in 1895 by the Community of the Sisters of the Church and remains in its original location on a single campus. The School is associated with the Anglican Diocese of Melbourne and is a member of the Association of Coeducational Schools (ACS) and the Junior School Heads Association of Australia.

The school educates students from 3-year-old kindergarten to the Victorian Certificate of Education (VCE), which all Year 12 students at St Michael's complete.

History

Foundation

In 1870, Mother Emily Ayckbowm founded the Community of the Sisters of the Church, a new Anglican religious order. The order was invited to Australia to further educational work for girls, and St Michael's was one of six schools established in different parts of Australia. They also founded schools in England, New Zealand and Canada. The schools, known as The Emily Group, share the same crest, patron saint and founding narrative, however, they all differ in significant ways, which enriches the group’s diversity. St Michael’s is the sole coeducational school in the group. On 23 April 1895, in Marlton Crescent, St Kilda, the Sisters opened an advanced primary school: The Church of England Day School (now St Michael's).

20th century

In 1972, St Michael’s Church of England Girls Grammar School Pty Ltd (later a company limited by guarantee) was established in 1972 to manage the School. The idea was put forward to make the school co-educational. In 1974 a coeducation subcommittee was established, and the School embarked on its coeducational journey. In 1980, with the appointment of a new Headmaster, Anthony Hewison, the decision was taken to admit boys to all levels of the school, thus making it fully coeducational, and to embark on modernising the school.

21st century

With the arrival of Headmaster Simon Gipson in the year 2000, the School administration adopted new approaches, including introducing modern terminology, a new school uniform, and a six-stage building plan, including the Sisters of the Church Learning Centre and the new playing surface for the oval.

On 6 December 2007, St Michael's purchased The Astor Theatre building in St Kilda. The cinema continued to operate as usual, with films screening at nights and on weekends, while the building was often used by the school for assemblies and events on weekdays. On 24 August 2012 the school announced that it had sold the building to Ralph Taranto.

The values and traditions imbued by the Sisters of the Church continue to guide the School and its holistic approach to education. The sisters have retained their interest in the school but no longer play a part in its governance. The school is managed by a Head who is appointed by a board of directors.

Academics
St Michael's offers a wide range of subjects including core mathematics, science, English, IT, LOTEs (Languages Other Than English), arts and humanities courses. At primary level, all students study basic subjects including mathematics, English, science, geography, history, Japanese, music and sport. The school is renowned for its Performing Arts program.

Sport 
St Michael's is a member of the Association of Coeducational Schools (ACS).

ACS premierships 
St Michael's has won the following ACS premierships.

Combined:

 Badminton (6) - 2002, 2003, 2004, 2008, 2009, 2012
 Beach Volleyball (2) - 2013, 2017
 Chess (6) - 2004, 2005, 2006, 2008, 2021, 2022
 Public Speaking (2) - 2020, 2022

Boys:

 Basketball - 2008, 2022
 Cricket (4) - 1998, 1999, 2000, 2003
 Football (2) - 1998, 2012
 Hockey (7) - 2000, 2002, 2010, 2011, 2016, 2018, 2019
 Soccer - 2013
 Softball (5) - 2000, 2006, 2008, 2013, 2017
 Table Tennis (10) - 1999, 2000, 2001, 2002, 2003, 2004, 2006, 2007, 2014, 2015
 Volleyball (11) - 2004, 2006, 2010, 2011, 2013, 2014, 2015, 2016, 2017, 2018, 2019, 2022

Girls:

 Basketball (3) - 1998, 2015, 2016
 Football - 2018
 Futsal - 2015
 Hockey (10) - 1998, 2000, 2012, 2013, 2014, 2015, 2016, 2017, 2018, 2019
 Netball - 2013
 Soccer (2) - 2006, 2007
 Softball (4) - 2010, 2016, 2017, 2018
 Volleyball (11) - 1999, 2005, 2006, 2008, 2009, 2010, 2012, 2013, 2014, 2017, 2018, 2022

Performing arts
Drama has one of the highest voluntary participation numbers among students of any department of the school. Each year the school performs a large number of productions, including Years 10 to 12 senior musical; the Years 7 to 9 musical and play; Dance Project (a contemporary dance production); a student production; a house drama festival and three yearly senior productions (Year 6, Years 7-9, Years 10-12). In 2001, St Michael's was the first school to stage a production at Melbourne’s Athenaeum Theatre with the performance of Les Misérables. The 2010 senior musical, 13, was the Australian premiere of the musical and won the best production award at the Victorian Musical Theatre Guild awards (the fourth St Michael's musical to do so).

St Michael's also conducts an annual house drama competition, and an annual house singing & aerobics competition, in which all five of the school houses perform a musical item. Many other musical ensembles perform regularly throughout the year, including the 7-12 Harrison Choir, which each year performs a large choral work, and the Grigoryan Orchestra (named for school alumnus, classical guitarist Slava Grigoryan).

Other programs

Great Barrier Reef project
The Great Barrier Reef project involves year 10 students studying VCE Unit 2 biology in Far North Queensland, participating in a month of research on the Great Barrier Reef. Activities include daily snorkelling from St Michael's Orpheus Island Research Campus.

Originally the program ran for a duration of one month, but has since been extended to include days in Townsville, Paluma and Tully to learn more about Indigenous culture.

Exodus program
Historically, when St Michael's student body was much smaller, the entire senior school went on school camp, or 'Exodus', together. Exodus camps have for many years been split between year and house groups for students in Years 7 to 11. Each student from Year 7 to Year 11 experiences a minimum of five days of outdoor education each year, with the programs run by the Outdoor Education Group. Junior school programs mainly involve staying in cabins (although part of the Year 6 Exodus involves sleeping in tents) and participating in various activities.

Senior school programs are quite diverse, ranging from bush walking in Year 7 to choices including rafting, kayaking, rock-climbing, tree-planting or cycling in year 11. Year 10 students may also have great choice in their Exoduses, including Hattah Solo, a popular program involving students spending 24 hours out of the week-long program alone (albeit in close proximity to other students and supervisors) for the purposes of reflection and learning self-sufficiency. Exodus for each year level is slightly more challenging than the last, and there is a different theme for each year level.

"Kosciuszko to the Coast"

Every year students in year 11 have the option to take part in the Kosciuszko to the Coast program in lieu of the year 11 Exodus (School camp). This is a challenging 20-day expedition where students travel (through various methods including snowshoeing, hiking, white-water rafting and canoeing) from Mount Kosciuszko to the coast of Victoria, camping along the way.

European Tour Choir

The European Touring Choir consists of boys and girls in Years 8-12. The group travels biannually to Europe to compete in international choir competitions and perform on world stagesy. Past tours have travelled to Rome, Carrara, Pisa, Venice, Vicenza, Nördlingen, Reykjavík, Copenhagen, Berlin, Leipzig, Hagen, Cologne, Voorburg, Amsterdam, Paris, London, Florence, York, Croissy, Munich and Vienna, including performances at Notre Dame Cathedral in Paris and the Llangollen International Eisteddfod in Wales.

Exchanges
St Michael's has student exchange programs with schools in Japan and France.

The Japanese exchange with Keio Shonan-Fujisawa Junior & Senior High School in Fujisawa, Kanagawa Prefecture has been operating for over 10 years.

The French exchange began in 1999 and takes place every two years, with Le Bon Sauveur in Paris. The St Michael's students usually go to France for five to six weeks during their summer holiday (December–January). The return trip to Australia by the students of Le Bon Sauveur usually happens in July–August of the following year.

Social service and charity work
The school is involved in social service, working to raise money for various charities. Once or twice a term, a Community Action Day is held, organised by the social service captains of each house, to raise money for a diverse number of charities. Every year in May, a prefect-organised program, the 'Merry Month of May', is held to raise money for social initiatives. Activities such as a 'Battle of the Bands', barbecues, dress-up days, movie viewings, novelty races, great debates and theatresport contests are held each day. Also in conjunction with the Merry Month of May, the school participates in the World's Greatest Shave for the Leukaemia Foundation, in which participants shave their heads to show solidarity for leukaemia sufferers, raising money through collecting donations. In 2016, the Merry Month of May raised a record sum of $30,678. The school leadership teams in both the senior and junior schools in 2011 also raised money for relief for the Christchurch earthquake, Japanese tsunami and subsequent nuclear disaster and the bushfires in Victoria and Queensland.

House system
The Junior School Houses (Years K-6) are Moss, Woods, Marlton and Cintra.

The Senior School Houses (Years 7-12) are Mitre, Sarum, Hughes, Kilburn and Breen. Mitre, Sarum, Hughes and Kilburn are the four original school houses and were all created in 1922, all significant for their own reasons. When the school started to grow a fifth senior school house, Breen was created in 1987. The pastoral care system is based on a house structure which deals with all matters relating to a student's wellbeing or curriculum needs. Each student is placed in a house tutorial group which is overseen by a house tutor. There are five houses and therefore five house tutorial groups at each year level. A house contains students from Years 7 to 12. Each house is led by two co-heads. The members of each house are led by co-house captains and co-vice-captains. The houses meet on a regular basis.

The house tutor and heads of house work as a team to monitor the academic and personal progress of each student in the house tutorial group and house. Generally, the house tutor is the first and main point of contact between the parent and the school.

School leaders

Principal
The following individuals have served as the school principal:

Head of the school
The following individuals have served as the head of the school or any previous title:

Notable alumni
 Marie Breen, politician 
 Philip Dalidakis, politician
 Slava Grigoryan, guitarist
 Joy Hester, artist
 Isabel Huntington, footballer and former AFL Women's No. 1 draft pick
 Asher Keddie, actress
 Samantha Lane, TV presenter
 Faith Leech, Olympic swimmer, gold and bronze medalist at the 1956 Olympic Games in Australia, Melbourne
 Andrew MacLeod, former United Nations humanitarian expert and former CEO of the Committee for Melbourne
 Eloise Mignon, actress 
 Radha Mitchell, actress
 Anna O'Byrne, singer
 Jan Skubiszewski, member of Jackson Jackson
 Dan Spielman, actor
 Nora Sumberg, artist
 Brodie Summers, Olympic Mogul skier and World Cup silver medalist
Winnie Laing, AFL Women's footballer 
 Sean Wroe, Australian sprinter, silver medalist in the 2010 Commonwealth Games in Delhi, India. Wroe also represented Australia at the 2006 Commonwealth Games, 2008 Olympic Games in Beijing.
Tess Coady, Olympic snowboarder, bronze medalist at the 2022 Winter Olympics in Beijing, China
Elena Galiabovitch, Australian shooter, Women's 10-metre air pistol bronze medalist at the 2018 Commonwealth Games. Galiabovitch has represented Australia in both the 2016 Rio Olympics and the 2020 Tokyo Olympics. Elena was selected to be by the International Olympic Committee as one of six athletes to carry the Olympic flag at the Games opening ceremony in Tokyo.

 Col Pearse, Paralympic Swimmer, bronze medalist at the 2021 Paralympics in Tokyo, Japan

See also

 List of schools in Victoria
 List of high schools in Victoria
 Victorian Certificate of Education

References

External links

St Michael's Grammar School website
Community of the Sisters of the Church website

Educational institutions established in 1895
Anglican secondary schools in Melbourne
Anglican primary schools in Melbourne
Grammar schools in Australia
Junior School Heads Association of Australia Member Schools
1895 establishments in Australia
St Kilda, Victoria
Buildings and structures in the City of Port Phillip